Coming Out Party is a 1934 American Pre-Code drama film directed by John G. Blystone starring Frances Dee, Gene Raymond, Alison Skipworth and Nigel Bruce. It was produced and distributed by the Fox Film Corporation.

Synopsis
Joy Stanhope, a Park Avenue debutante whose Coming out party is the highlight of the social calendar. Although she is linked to the very eligible bachelor Jimmy Wolverton, she is in fact in love with Chris Hansen, a violinist in a jazz band and the son of poor Swedish immigrants. She keeps secret her relationship with Hansen, knowing her parents would not approve. In fact they pressure her to go on a date with Wolverton, which enrages Hansen. After quarrelling they reunite later that night and soon after she finds herself pregnant.

She is about to tell Hansen, when he announces that he has received a "once in a lifetime" offer to tour Europe with a renowned opera singer. Unwilling to deny him this chance she keeps silent about her pregnancy. While he is away, in a daze of distress, she elopes with Wolverton and marries him. When Hansen finds out about this from the family's kindly Scottish butler he returns to America.

Cast
Frances Dee as Joyce 'Joy' Stanhope
Gene Raymond as Chris Hansen
Alison Skipworth as Miss Gertrude Vanderdoe
Nigel Bruce as Troon
Harry Green as Harry Gold
Gilbert Emery as Herbert Emerson Stanhope
Marjorie Gateson as Mrs. Ada Stanhope
Phillip Trent as Jimmy Wolverton 
Jessie Ralph as Nora
Germaine De Neel as Louise
Paul Porcasi as Manager
Jean De Briac as Frenchman
Claude King as Stanhope's Attorney

References

External links 
 

1934 films
Fox Film films
American drama films
1934 drama films
Films directed by John G. Blystone
American black-and-white films
Films set in New York City
1930s English-language films
1930s American films